Aleksandr Gavrilovich Abdulov (Russian: Алекса́ндр Гаври́лович Абду́лов; 29 May 1953 – 3 January 2008) was a Soviet and Russian film and stage actor, film director, screenwriter and television presenter. People's Artist of the RSFSR (1991).

Biography 
Aleksandr Abdulov went to school from 1960 to 1970, and upon graduation wanted to become a sportsman. However, Abdulov's father encouraged his son to act, and Aleksandr Abdulov starred in About Vitya, about Masha and the Sea Force, 1974. In 1975 he graduated from GITIS and was hired by Lenkom Theater director Mark Zakharov.

Aleksandr Abdulov appeared in several films in the 1970s. In 1977 he was in the TV version The Twelve Chairs, directed by Mark Zakharov. In 1978 he became a celebrity after his role in An Ordinary Miracle. In 1979 Abdulov appeared in The Meeting Place Cannot Be Changed with Vladimir Vysotskiy. That year he also had roles in Do not part with the Loved Ones and The Very Same Munchhausen.

During the early 1980s, he was considered a sex symbol. In 1982 he performed in Look for a Woman, Magicians and The Woman in White. In 1982, he was given a role in The House That Swift Built (a film about Jonathan Swift) as Dr. Simpson. In 1984 Abdulov was in The Formula of Love and, the following year, In Search for Captain Grant. He also performed in The Most Charming and Attractive and Naval Cadets, Charge!.

Aleksandr Abdulov then went on to play in Desyat Negrityat (based on Agatha Christie's mystery novel Ten Little Indians) in 1987 and To Kill a Dragon in 1988. The next year he had a role in Black Rose Is an Emblem of Sorrow, Red Rose Is an Emblem of Love.

Abdulov was in Genius, The House under the Starry Sky (both made in 1991) and "Gold" (1992). During the 1990s he mostly worked in the Lenkom Theatre. In 2000 he performed in Still Waters and The Christmas Miracle with Chulpan Khamatova. In 2002 he appeared in the TV series Next (the title is the actual English word), where he played a Russian oligarch. He reprised the role in the sequel "Next 2" (2003). The following year he was in About Love.

In 2005, Abdulov had roles in the TV series Anna Karenina and The Master and Margarita. In 2006 he directed the play One Flew Over the Cuckoo's Nest at the Lenkom and played the lead character of Randall P. McMurphy (played by Jack Nicholson in the American film). He also had an appearance in the film Attack on Leningrad.

Attitude to the mass media
In the last years of his life, Abdulov had extremely tense relations with the mass media, especially the tabloids. He vehemently resented all false information about him and hated those unscrupulous journalists who tried to pry into his personal life. On Man and Law, aired on Russia's Channel One, Abdulov said once that he owned a licensed gun and he would not hesitate to shoot any trespasser who dared to enter the territory of his dacha during his forthcoming birthday party.

Marriages
Aleksandr Abdulov was married three times. His first marriage was to Irina Alfyorova, by whom he had a stepdaughter, Ksenia Alfyorova. His second wife was Galina, a theatre administrator. In 2006 he married Julia Miloslavskaya, who gave birth to their daughter Eugenia in 2007.

Health problems and death

Abdulov was a smoker throughout his adult life. In August 2007, the actor experienced health problems, supposedly an ulcer. However, in September of the same year he was diagnosed with lung cancer in an Israeli clinic. .

He was last seen in public in mid-December 2007 at an awards ceremony at the Kremlin, where Vladimir Putin awarded the actor with the Order "For Merit to the Fatherland", 4th class.

He died on 3 January 2008, aged 54.

Honors and awards
 Honored Artist of the RSFSR (1986)
 People's Artist of the RSFSR (1991)
 Order of Honour (1997)
 Order "For Merit to the Fatherland", 4th class (2007)

Selected filmography

1974: Moscow, My Love as boyfriend
1974: Pro Vityu, pro Mashu i morskuyu pekhotu as paratrooper Kozlov
1975: The Lost Expedition
1977: Golden River as Boris Rogov
1976: Twelve Chairs (Двенадцать стульев) as engineer Ernest Schukin
1977: An Ordinary Miracle (Обыкновенное чудо) (TV Mini-Series) as the Bear
1977: 72 gradusa nizhe nulya as Lionka Savostikov
1978: Alenkiy tsvetochek as Prince
1978: Front Beyond the Front Line as Soldier (uncredited)
1978: Pobeg iz tyurmy as Nikolay Bauman
1978: Dvoe v novom dome 
1979: Vsyo reshayet mgnoveniye as Viktor Varentsov, pervyy trener Nadi
1979: The Meeting Place Cannot Be Changed (Место встречи изменить нельзя) (TV Mini-Series) as driver for the gang
1979: The Very Same Munchhausen (Тот самый Мюнхгаузен) (TV Movie) as Heinrich Rammkopf
1980: Do Not Part with Your Beloved (С любимыми не расставайтесь) as Mitya Lavrov
1981: Zhenshchina v belom as Walter Hartwright
1981: Sitsilianskaya zashchita as Yevgeniy Borisovich Volkov -restorer
1981: Fakty minuvshego dnya
1982: Carnival (Карнавал) as Nikita
1982: Premonition of Love (Предчувствие любви) as Sergey Vishnyakov
1982: The House That Swift Built (Дом, который построил Свифт) (TV Movie) as Richard Simpson, Doctor
1982: Charodei (Чародеи) (TV Movie) as Ivan Sergeevich Puhov
1983: Look for a Woman (Ищите женщину) (TV Movie) as Robert de Charans
1983: Retsept yeyo molodosti
1984: Formula of Love (Формула любви) as (TV Movie) Jacob
1984: Dva gusara as Sashka
1985: The Most Charming and Attractive (Самая обаятельная и привлекательная) as Volodya Smirnov
1985: In Search for Captain Grant (В поисках капитана Гранта) as Bob the Tar
1986: Tayny madam Vong
1986: Khrani menya, moy talisman
1987: Soshedshie s nebes as Sergey
1987: And Then There Were None (Десять негритят) as Anthony Marston
1988: Gardemarines ahead! (Гардемарины, вперёд!) as Count Vasily Lyadashchev
1988: Filyor
1988: To Kill a Dragon (Убить Дракона) as Lancelot
1989: Spasi i sokhrani
1989: Za prekrasnykh dam! as Bandit
1989: Lady Macbeth of the Mtsensk District (Леди Макбет Мценского уезда) as Sergei
1990: Black Rose Is an Emblem of Sorrow, Red Rose Is an Emblem of Love (Чёрная роза — эмблема печали, красная роза — эмблема любви) as Vladimir
1990: Zhivaja mishen
1991: Genius (Гений) as Sergey Nenashev
1991: Sons of Bitches (Сукины дети) as Igor Gordynsky
1991: Unizhennye i oskorblennye
1991: Dom pod zvyozdnym nebom as Zhora, the plumber
1991: Caccia alla vedova as Prince Badritzky
1992: Zoloto
1992: Sumasshedshaya lyubov as Reporter
1992: Ofitsiant s zolotym podnosom as Aleksei Udaltsov
1993: Prison Romance (Тюремный романс) as Artynov
1993: Strannye muzhchiny Semyonovoy Ekateriny as Igor / Katya's ex-lover (policeman)
1993: Ya vinovat
1993: Nad temnoy vodoy as Lev
1993: Grekh. Istoriya strasti
1994: Prostodushnyy
1994: Nastya as Teterin
1994: Kafe im Limon as Valery Ostrovsky
1995: Chyornaya vual
1995: ...Pervaya lyubov
1997: Shizofreniya'
1999: Women's Property (Женская собственность) as Sazonov
2000: Still Waters (Тихие омуты) as academician Anton Kashtanov
2000: The Christmas Miracle (Рождественская мистерия) as the puppeteer
2000: Rozhdestvenskaya misteriya2001: Zhyoltyy karlik as Vladimir Zharovsky
2002: O'key2003: A poutru oni prosnulis as Mrachnyi
2004: O lyubvi as Grigori Stepanovich Smirnov
2005: The Master and Margarita (Мастер и Маргарита) (TV Mini-Series) as Koroviev
2005: The Case of "Dead Souls" (Дело о «Мёртвых душах») (TV Mini-Series) as Nozdryov
2006: Park Sovetskogo perioda2006: The Funeral Party (Ниоткуда с любовью, или Весёлые похороны) as Alik
2007: Actress (Артистка) as Bosyakin
2009: Attack on Leningrad (Ленинград) as Chigasov
2010: Pravosudie volkov'' as Writer Volodya (final film role)

References

External links

Archived Geocities closed in 2009 (Archived 2009-10-25)
Jamestown
 Alexander Abdulov Biographical RIA Novosti

1953 births
2008 deaths
20th-century Russian male actors
21st-century Russian male actors
People from Tobolsk
Russian Academy of Theatre Arts alumni
Honored Artists of the RSFSR
People's Artists of the RSFSR
Recipients of the Nika Award
Recipients of the Order "For Merit to the Fatherland", 4th class
Recipients of the Order of Honour (Russia)
Russian male film actors
Russian male stage actors
Russian male television actors
Russian male voice actors
Russian television presenters
Soviet male film actors
Soviet male stage actors
Soviet male television actors
Soviet male voice actors
Deaths from lung cancer in Russia
Burials at Vagankovo Cemetery